A list of the most notable films produced in Bulgaria during the 1970s grouped by year of release. For an alphabetical list of articles on Bulgarian films see :Category:Bulgarian films.

1970

1971

1972

1973

1974

1975

1976

1977

1978

1979

Notes

References
 
 The Internet movie database

1970s
Lists of 1970s films
Films